Anandghan was a 17th-century Jain monk, mystical poet and hymnist. Though very little is known about his life, his collection of hymns about philosophy, devotion and spirituality in vernacular languages are popular and still sung in Jain temples.

Life
There is no historical information available about life of Anandghan. The majority of information is based in hagiographies and oral history.

He was born in Rajputana (now Rajasthan, India). His dates differs according to sources. Generally 1603 or 1604 is accepted but he could have born before 1624 according to some estimation. His childhood name was Labhanand. He was initiated as Jain monk and named Labhavijay. He might belonged to Tapa Gaccha branch of Murtipujaka Svetambara Jainism but Jain monastic hierarchy does not mention him. He might have lived as ascetic not associated with any organized ascetic branches. He stayed in the area of present-day north Gujarat and Rajasthan in India. Legends associate him with Mount Abu and Jodhpur. He is associated with Yashovijay also and said to have met him. He could have died in Medata in Rajasthan as a hall is dedicated to him is there. His death dates varies according to sources. Generally accepted dates are 1673 or 1674 but could have died before 1694.

Works
His language is mix of vernacular languages like Gujarati, Rajasthani and Braj. It follows Rajasthani style of diction but is written in medieval Gujarati. It was the time when Bhakti movement was at peak and majority of devotional poets of time wrote in such vernacular languages. His works are focused bhakti (devotion) as well as internal spirituality.

Anandghan Chauvisi is the philosophical treatises which supposed to contain twenty four hymns but contains twenty two. Other two hymns were later added by others. Each verse is dedicated to one of twenty four Jain tirthankaras. The legend tells that he composed these hymns in Mount Abu during his meet with Yashovijay who memorised them.

Anandghan Bahattari is the anthology of hymns which differs in a number of hymns according to different manuscripts. This anthology was formed by 1775 and was transmitted orally as well as the written manuscripts. It contains pada (verses) with different ragas. Some of these verses drawn from other poets like Kabir, Surdas, Banarasidas and others.

Legacy 
Yashovijay, the philosopher Jain monk, was influenced by him. He wrote commentary on Chauvisi and also wrote eight verse Ashtapadi dedicated to him.

His hymns are still popular in followers of Jainism as well as non-Jains because they are nonsectarian in nature and put emphasis on internal spirituality. They are sung in Jain temples. They are found in religious hymn collections especially in the collection of Digambara hymns even though he is associated with Svetambara sects. A religious camp organized by Shrimad Rajchandra Mission of Rakesh Jhaveri in 2006 at Dharampur, Gujarat had lectures on Chauvisi. Mahatma Gandhi included his hymn, "One may say Rama, Rahman, Krishna or Shiva, then" in Ashram Bhajanavali, his prayer book.

A Gujarai play Apoorav Khela (2012) based on his life was produced by Dhanvant Shah and directed by Manoj Shah.

Further reading

Notes and references

Note

References

External links
 Anandghan on Jainpedia

Jain philosophy
17th-century Indian philosophers
17th-century Indian poets
Indian Jain monks
17th-century Indian Jains
17th-century Jain monks
17th-century Indian monks
Śvētāmbara monks